The Tour de la province de Namur (English: Tour of the Province of Namur is a cycling race held annually in the Liège province of Belgium.

Winners

Wins by country

References

External links

Cycle races in Belgium
Recurring sporting events established in 1948
1948 establishments in Belgium